Adam Parkhouse (born 15 December 1992) is an Australian footballer who plays as a midfielder for Sydney Olympic.

Playing career
Parkhouse moved to Witton Albion on loan from Stalybridge Celtic in September 2013.

He signed for Mossley in September 2014, playing four times for the club.

In August 2016, Parkhouse signed for A-League club Wellington Phoenix from Manly United on a one-year deal.

On 14 December 2016, just in time for his 24th birthday, Parkhouse signed a two-year extension with Wellington Phoenix.

On 20 July 2018, Parkhouse left the Wellington Phoenix after agreeding to a mutual termination of his contract

References

External links

1992 births
Living people
Association football midfielders
Australian soccer players
Wellington Phoenix FC players
A-League Men players
National Premier Leagues players
Mossley A.F.C. players
Skelmersdale United F.C. players
Witton Albion F.C. players
Manly United FC players
Stalybridge Celtic F.C. players
Leigh Genesis F.C. players
Atherton Laburnum Rovers F.C. players